Harry Hicks (6 August 1925 – 25 April 2012) was a British long-distance runner and administrator for the Southern Cross Country Association (SEEA). He competed in the marathon at the 1956 Summer Olympics.

Running for England in the 1949 and 1950 International CC Championship. He won the AAA Marathon Championship. After qualifying for the 1956 Melbourne Olympics he finished 15th. After retiring as an athlete he became the Southern Cross Country Association until the late 1980s. He was ECCA President in 1993. He died from pancreatic cancer on 25 April 2012.

References

1925 births
2012 deaths
Athletes (track and field) at the 1956 Summer Olympics
British male long-distance runners
British male marathon runners
Olympic athletes of Great Britain
Athletes from London